Khokhloma (also Hohloma,) or  Khokhloma painting (Khokhlomskaya rospis) is the name of a Russian wood painting handicraft style and national ornament, known for its curved and vivid mostly flower, berry and leaf patterns.  Often Firebird, the figure from the Russian fairytale,  is also depicted. 

A combination of red, black, and gold are typical colors for Khokhloma. 
When painted on wood, in most cases red, black, green, yellow and orange are used over a gold background.  The effect it has when applied to wooden tableware or furniture, making it look heavier and metallic.

History

The style is named for the village of  Khokhloma in Koverninsky District,  Nizhny Novgorod Oblast, Volga region, where it first appeared in the second half of the 17th century.

The production of painted dishes in Khokhloma is first mentioned in 1659 in the letter of a boyar called Morozov to his bailiff, containing an order for the following: "One hundred painted dishes polished with powdered tin, both large and medium, of the very same kind possessed by us earlier, not forgetting twenty large painted wine bowls, twenty medium, and twenty somewhat smaller".

The handicraft owes its origin to the Old Believers, who, fleeing from persecutions of officials, took refuge in local woods. Even earlier, however, local villagers had experience in making tableware from soft woods. 
Among the schismatics there were icon-painters, who taught local craftsmen the special  technique of painting wood in a golden color without the use of genuine real gold.

Articles carved out of wood (mostly tableware) were usually primed with clay mortar, raw linseed oil, and tin powder (nowadays aluminum is used). A floral pattern was then painted on top of this coating with a brush. After that, the articles were coated with linseed oil (nowadays, synthetic oil) and hardened in a kiln at high temperatures. 
There are two principal wood painting techniques used in the Khokhloma, such as the so-called "superficial technique" (red and black colors over the goldish one) and the "background technique" (a goldish silhouette-like design over the colored background).

In its early days Khokhloma became known in the Orient and the art of wood were produced for Indian and  Persian markets. Through an exhibition in Paris at the end of the 19th century, the Khokhloma style became known in the west.
The style seemed to be fading away in the early 20th century, but it revitalized during the Soviet times. The Khokhloma craftsmen united into artels in the 1920s to early 1930s. In the 1960s, the Soviets built a factory called the Khokhloma Painter near the Khokhloma village and an industrial association called the Khokhloma Painting in a town of Semyonov. These two factories have become the Khokhloma centers of Russia and produce tableware, utensils (mostly spoons), furniture, souvenirs etc.

Unique works of Khokhloma art can be seen in a Khokhloma Museum that was opened in the factory of Semyonov in 1972. Among them there is a huge Khokhloma spoon 2 meters and 67 cm large and a bowl one and a half meter large.

Gallery

See also
List of Russian inventions

References

External links

Russian handicrafts
Handicrafts
Russian inventions
Culture of Nizhny Novgorod Oblast
Koverninsky District